The 2020 South American Under-20 Women's Football Championship was the 9th edition of the South American Under-20 Women's Football Championship, the biennial international youth football championship organised by CONMEBOL for the women's under-20 national teams of South America. It was partially held in Argentina between 4–14 March 2020 until it was suspended and later cancelled due to the COVID-19 pandemic.

The tournament was originally scheduled to be held between 4–22 March 2020. However, on 12 March 2020, CONMEBOL announced that the tournament would be suspended once the first stage ends and that the final stage (originally scheduled to be played from 16 to 22 March) would be postponed for dates and venue to be confirmed, due to the outbreak of COVID-19 pandemic in South America.

CONMEBOL announced on 19 March 2020 that the tournament would be resumed in early July. On 1 June 2020, after FIFA postponed the 2020 FIFA U-20 Women's World Cup until January/February 2021 due to the COVID-19 pandemic, CONMEBOL announced that the final stage would be played in October. On 6 August 2020, CONMEBOL confirmed that the final stage would be played between 16 and 22 November 2020. On 30 October 2020, CONMEBOL further postponed the final stage to January 2021.

In November 2020 FIFA decides to cancel the 2021 FIFA U-20 Women's World Cup due to health and safety reasons related to the COVID-19 pandemic. Consequently, on 25 November, CONMEBOL announced that the final stage would be held in the second half of 2021 in order to complete the tournament. Eventually, CONMEBOL decided to cancel the final stage of the tournament during a meeting of its council held on 3 August 2021.

As the 2021 FIFA U-20 Women's World Cup was cancelled this tournament would not have served as qualifier for any FIFA U-20 Women's World Cup. Originally the top two teams would have qualified as the CONMEBOL representatives.

Brazil are the defending champions.

Teams 
All ten CONMEBOL member national teams are eligible to enter the tournament.

Venues
The matches will be played in two venues in two cities.
Estadio San Juan del Bicentenario, San Juan, San Juan Province
Estadio Provincial Juan Gilberto Funes, La Punta, San Luis Province

Draw 
The draw of the tournament was held on 11 January 2020, 10:00 ART (UTC−3), at the headquarters of the Argentine Football Association in Buenos Aires. The ten teams were drawn into two groups of five teams. The hosts Argentina and the defending champions Brazil were seeded into Groups A and B respectively, while the other eight teams were divided into four pots based on their results in the 2018 South American Under-20 Women's Football Championship, and were drawn to the remaining group positions.

Squads

Players born on or after 1 January 2000 are eligible to compete in the tournament. Each team could register a maximum of 22 players.

Match officials
A total of 10 referees, 20 assistant referees, and two support referees were selected for the tournament.

First stage
The top two teams of each group advance to the final stage.

Tiebreakers
The ranking of teams in the first stage is determined as follows (Regulations Article 8):
 Points obtained in all group matches (three points for a win, one for a draw, none for a defeat);
 Goal difference in all group matches;
 Number of goals scored in all group matches;
 Points obtained in the matches played between the teams in question;
 Goal difference in the matches played between the teams in question;
 Number of goals scored in the matches played between the teams in question;
 Fair play points in all group matches (only one deduction could be applied to a player in a single match): 
 Drawing of lots.

All times local, ART (UTC−3).

Group A

Group B

Final stage
The ranking of teams in the final stage is determined using the same tiebreakers as in the first stage, taking into account only matches in the final stage (Regulations Article 8).

The top two teams would have qualified for the 2021 FIFA U-20 Women's World Cup.

Winners

Goalscorers

References

External links
CONMEBOL Sub 20 Femenino Argentina 2020, CONMEBOL.com

2020
2020 South American Under-20 Women's Football Championship
Under-20 Women's Football Championship
2020 in Argentine football
2020 in women's association football
2020 in youth association football
2020 FIFA U-20 Women's World Cup qualification
March 2020 sports events in South America
Association football events cancelled due to the COVID-19 pandemic